Cur Deus Homo? (Latin for "Why a God Human?"), usually translated Why God Became a Man, is a book written by Anselm of Canterbury in the period of 1094–1098. In this work he proposes the satisfaction view of the atonement.

Anselm says his reason for writing the book is:

References

External links
 Cur Deus Homo 
 Cur Deus Homo (Deane's 1903 translation) 

Scholasticism
Christian theology books
11th-century Latin books